Jesús Antonio Leal Bernal (born 18 December 1992) is a Mexican professional footballer who plays as a midfielder for Coras de Nayarit.

Club career

América

Jesús Leal debuted with América during the Apertura 2013, making three appearances, and also played with the club in the CONCACAF Champions League tournament that same year.

Potros UAEM
Leal signed with Potros UAEM for the 2019 season.

Honours
América
 Liga MX: Apertura 2014

Real Monarchs
 USL Championship Regular Season Title: 2017

References

External links
 
 
 Jesús Leal at FootballDatabase.eu

1992 births
Living people
Mexican expatriate footballers
Mexican footballers
Association football midfielders
Club América footballers
Cimarrones de Sonora players
Real Monarchs players
Potros UAEM footballers
Real Estelí F.C. players
Coras de Nayarit F.C. footballers
Liga MX players
Ascenso MX players
Liga Premier de México players
Tercera División de México players
USL Championship players
Expatriate soccer players in the United States
Expatriate footballers in Nicaragua
Mexican expatriate sportspeople in the United States
Mexican expatriate sportspeople in Nicaragua
Footballers from Sinaloa
Sportspeople from Culiacán